Final standings of the 1972–73 Hungarian League season.

Final standings

Results

Statistical leaders

Top goalscorers

References

Nemzeti Bajnokság I seasons
1972–73 in Hungarian football
Hun